Michael Desborough (born 28 November 1969) is an English former footballer who made one appearance in the Football League for Colchester United as a goalkeeper. He also played for a number of London and Essex-based non-League teams.

Career
Born in Newham, London, Desborough made appearances for non-League clubs Clapton, Hornchurch, Aveley, Purfleet and Chelmsford City. From Chelmsford, he went on loan to Essex neighbours and Football League club Colchester United in 1993, making a single appearance in a 3–0 away defeat to Gillingham on 30 October. After his brief spell in a professional league, Desborough returned to Chelmsford and later played for Braintree Town, Dagenham & Redbridge, Canvey Island, Purfleet for a second stint, Burnham Ramblers, Grays Athletic, Bishop's Stortford, Leyton and a return to Hornchurch.

References

1969 births
Living people
Footballers from the London Borough of Newham
English footballers
Association football goalkeepers
Clapton F.C. players
Hornchurch F.C. players
Aveley F.C. players
Thurrock F.C. players
Chelmsford City F.C. players
Colchester United F.C. players
Braintree Town F.C. players
Dagenham & Redbridge F.C. players
Canvey Island F.C. players
Burnham Ramblers F.C. players
Grays Athletic F.C. players
Bishop's Stortford F.C. players
Leyton F.C. players
English Football League players